Albert B. Cleage Jr.  (June 1911 – February 20, 2000) was a Black nationalist Christian minister, political candidate, newspaper publisher, political organizer, and author. He founded the prominent Shrine of the Black Madonna Church, as well as the Shrine Cultural Centers and Bookstores in Detroit, Michigan, and Atlanta, Georgia, and Houston, Texas . All locations still open and functioning under the BCN mission. Cleage, who changed his name to Jaramogi Abebe Agyeman in the early 1970s, played an important role in the Civil Rights Movement in Detroit during the 1960s and 1970s. He became increasingly involved with Black nationalism and Black separatism during the 1970s, rejecting many of the core principles of racial integration. He founded a church-owned farm, Beulah Land, in Calhoun Falls, South Carolina, and spent most of his last years there. He was the father of daughters Kristin Cleage and writer Pearl Cleage.

He died on February 20, 2000, at 88 while visiting Beulah Land, his church's new farm.

Early life

Albert B. Cleage Jr. was born in 1911 in Indianapolis, the first of seven children. During much of his later life, his light skin color would become a common feature of discussion. His first biographer, Detroit News reporter Hiley Ward said it left him with a lifelong identity crisis.  Grace Lee Boggs would later describe Cleage as "pink-complexioned, with blue eyes, and light brown, almost blond hair.". His father graduated from Indiana School of Medicine in 1910 and moved to Kalamazoo, Michigan to practice before taking a position in Detroit. Dr. Cleage helped found Dunbar Hospital, Detroit's only hospital that granted admitting privileges to Black doctors and trained African-American residents. Dr. Cleage was a major figure in the Detroit medical community, even being designated as City Physician by Mayor Charles Bowles in 1930.

Upon graduation from Detroit's Northwestern High School, Albert Cleage had a peripatetic post-secondary education. He attended Wayne State University beginning in 1929, finally graduating in 1942 with his BA in sociology, but he also studied at Fisk University under Sociologist Charles S. Johnson. He worked as a social worker for the Detroit Department of Health before commencing seminary studies at Oberlin College in 1938, finally earning his Bachelor of Divinity from Oberlin Graduate School of Theology in 1943. He married Doris Graham in 1943 and he was ordained in the Congregational Christian Churches during the same year. He had two daughters and later divorced Graham in 1955. Cleage's final encounter with formal education was at the University of Southern California's film school in the 1950s. He was interested in creating religious films, but withdrew after a semester to take a position in a San Francisco congregation.

Religious leadership

Following ordination, he began a pastorate with Chandler Memorial Congregational Church in Lexington, Kentucky.  In 1944, he became the  pastor in an integrated church in San Francisco, The Church of the Fellowship of All Peoples, but that did not work out for long. In 1946, he became the pastor of St. John's Congregational Church in Springfield, Massachusetts.  He served there until he returned to Detroit in 1951.  Upon returning, he served at an integrated church, St. Mark's Community Church (United Presbyterian Church of North America) mission.  However, some of the white leaders of the church disagreed with the way Cleage was leading his Black congregation.  In 1953, Cleage and group of followers left the church and formed the Central Congregational Church that in the mid-1960s was renamed Central United Church of Christ.  Their mission was to minister to the less fortunate and they offered many programs for the poor, political leadership, and education. He resisted the inclusion of whites in the massive Walk to Freedom on June 23, 1963, in Detroit; it would be the last time he participated with white liberals as he moved away from the integrationist model of leadership of the Rev. Martin Luther King Jr. and toward the Black separatism/nationalism of Malcolm X.  In 1964 he help found a Michigan branch of the Freedom Now Party and ran for Governor of Michigan as a candidate in a "Black slate" of candidates. He was editor of a church published weekly tabloid newspaper called the Illustrated News that was widely circulated throughout African-American neighborhoods in Detroit during the 1960s. From its founding he worked with the New Detroit Committee founded by Joseph L. Hudson Jr., an organization formed during the 1967 Detroit riot designed to heal racial and economic divisions in the city that were exposed by the civil disorder. Cleage later renounced his participation and returned a grant of $100,000 to the organization. In 1967, he began the Black Christian National Movement.  This movement was encouraging black churches to reinterpret Jesus's teachings to suit the social, economic, and political needs of black people.  In March 1967, Cleage installed a painting of a black Madonna holding the baby Jesus in his church and renamed the church The Shrine of the Black Madonna.

In 1970, the Shrine of the Black Madonna was later renamed Pan African Orthodox Christian Church, the black Christian nationalist movement. More shrines were made in Kalamazoo, Atlanta and Houston. The mission of the shrines was, and is, to bring the black community back to a more conscious understanding of their African history, in order to effect positive progression as a whole.

Cleage then changed his name to Jaramogi Abebe Agyeman, meaning "liberator, holy man, savior of the nation" in Swahili. Agyeman did not believe in integration for the blacks. He thought that it was important for them to be able to obtain and maintain an economic, political, and social environment of their own. He founded the City-wide Citizens Action Committee to help with black business. He promoted the education of the black children by black teachers.

Writings

Cleage's book The Black Messiah, which depicted Jesus as a revolutionary leader, was published in 1968. Cleage thought it was important to change the idea of a "white" Jesus to a "black" Jesus to help the African-American population and establish the truth behind Jesus' racial identity. The book may be based on the book Ethiopian Manifesto by Robert Young. Cleage's second book, published in 1972, was called Black Christian Nationalism. It was focused on the idea that Jesus was black and that he was to save the black population. He stated that if blacks believed this then they would be able to correct their economic and political issues. This book taught that it was the black population as a whole that mattered not as an individual as Christianity taught. Cleage wanted to save the black people as a whole. This book introduced the  Black Christian Nationalist Movement as its own denomination.

Selected bibliography
"The Death of Fear. "Focus on Detroit" edition. November 1967. Vol. 17, No. 1. Johnson Publishing Company.
The Black Messiah . New York: Sheed and Ward, 1968. (Reprint: Africa World Press, 1989.)
Myths about Malcolm X: Two Views (with George Breitman). University of California: Merit Publishers, 1968.
Black Christian Nationalism: New Directions for the Black Church New York: W. Morrow, 1972

Notes

External links
Shrine of the Black Madonna Bookstore and Cultural Center
Jaramogi Abebe Agyeman
Albert Cleage
Albert Cleage biography, Detroit African-American History Project
"Intro to Afro-American Studies"
"Cleage, Albert, Jr. (Jaramogi Abebe Agyeman) (1911-2000)", BlackPast.org

1911 births
2000 deaths
Writers from Indianapolis
Wayne State University alumni
United Church of Christ ministers
American Congregationalist ministers
African-American Christian clergy
American Christian clergy
African-American writers
American writers
People from Calhoun Falls, South Carolina
Northwestern High School (Michigan) alumni
20th-century American clergy
20th-century African-American people
20th-century Congregationalist ministers